The Cornplanter Medal was named for the Iroquois chief Cornplanter and is an award for scholastic and other contributions to the betterment of knowledge of the Iroquois people. It was initiated by University of Chicago anthropologist Frederick Starr with seed money from nine associates in order to engrave and print sketches of Iroquois games and dances. Starr had two main goals while he planned the medal: 

One, he wanted to recognize and award the people who were contributing to research and knowledge of the Iroquois. 

Two, he intended to prove that the tribe, contrary to some academic opinion, had artisans that showed abilities of a "true artist", by presenting and preserving the art of the Iroquois youth Jesse Cornplanter. 

The medal was endowed through sales of the publication of the sketches in the booklet Iroquois Indian Games and Dances (c. 1903). The young artist of the sketches was credited as "Jesse Cornplanter, Seneca Indian Boy".

First presented in 1904 by the Cayuga County Historical Society in Auburn NY, it was awarded every two years to people who fall into one or more of the following classes:
 Ethnologists, making worthy field-studies or other investigations among the Iroquois.
 Historians, making actual contributions to our knowledge of the Iroquois.
 Artists, worthily representing Iroquois life or types by brush or chisel.
 Philanthropists, whose efforts are based upon adequate scientific study and appreciation of Iroquois conditions and needs.

List of medal recipients

 1904 General John S. Clark, historian and archaeologist
 1906 Rev. William Martin Beauchamp, archaeologist and ethnologist
 1908 Dr. David Boyle, archaeologist and ethnologist
 1910 William P. Letchworth, philanthropist
 1912 Reuben Gold Thwaites, historian
 1914 J.N.B. Hewitt, ethnologist
 1916 Arthur C. Parker, archaeologist and ethnologist
 1919 Alvin H. Dewey, philanthropist
 1920 Mary Clark Thompson, philanthropist
 1923 Professor Frederick Houghton, archaeologist
 1926 Edwin H. Gohl, archaeologist and artist
 1965 William N. Fenton, ethnologist and historian
 1966 William A. Ritchie, archaeologist
 1967 Merle H. Deardorff, ethnologist and historian
 1968 Aldelphena Logan, artist
 1969 Kenneth E. Kidd, historian and archaeologist
 1970 Anthony F. C. Wallace, ethnologist and historian
 1971 Floyd G. Lounsbury, linguist and ethnologist
 1975 Marian E. White, archaeologist and historian; and  Walter K. Long, artist
 1977 Richard S. MacNeish, archaeologist
 1979 Bruce G. Trigger, historian and archaeologist

See also

 List of archaeology awards
 List of history awards

References

Attributions

External links
Iroquois Indian games and dances: drawn by Jesse Cornplanter, Seneca Indian boy: Amherst College Archives & Special Collections

Academic awards
Archaeology awards
Awards established in 1914
1914 establishments in New York (state)
Iroquois
Cayuga County, New York